Tim McGraw and the Dancehall Doctors is the seventh studio album by American country music artist Tim McGraw and the first to feature his band The Dancehall Doctors. It was released in November 2002 and was recorded on a mountaintop studio in upstate New York. Four singles were released. Two songs were in the movie Black Cloud, starring McGraw. The album also included a cover of Elton John's "Tiny Dancer", which was released only to the AC format, although it also reached the country charts from unsolicited airplay. The album debuted at number 2 on the Billboard 200 with first week sales of 602,000 copies.

Track listing

ASong also featured in the movie Black Cloud

Personnel 

Tim McGraw & the Dancehall Doctors
 Tim McGraw – lead vocals
 Jeff McMahon – keyboards
 Denny Hemingson – electric guitar, baritone guitar, slide guitar, steel guitar, Melobar guitar
 Bob Minner – acoustic guitar, dobro
 Darran Smith – electric guitar
 Deano Brown – fiddle, mandolin
 John Marcus – bass 
 Billy Mason – drums
 David Dunkley – percussion

Additional Musicians
 Steve Nathan – synth horns (5), organ (5), Wurlitzer electric piano (11)
 John Prestia – electric guitar (10), harmonica (12)
 B. James Lowry – acoustic guitar (12)
 Byron Gallimore – electric guitar (14)
 Kirk "Jelly Roll" Johnson – harmonica (12)
 Frank Macek – loops (1, 4, 8, 11)
 David Campbell – string arrangements (8, 15)
 Paul Buckmaster – string arrangements (11)

Background vocals
 Greg Barnhill (1, 15)
 Kim Carnes (1, 15)
 Gene Miller (2-6, 8-15)
 Chris Rodriguez (2-6, 8-14)
 Don Henley (7)
 Timothy B. Schmit (7)

Production 
 Byron Gallimore – producer 
 Tim McGraw – producer, creative director, photography 
 Darran Smith – producer 
 Julian King – tracking engineer 
 Ricky Cobble – second tracking engineer, additional engineer 
 Steve Churchyard – string engineer (8, 11, 15) 
 Dennis Davis – additional engineer
 Jason Gantt – additional engineer
 Tony Green – additional engineer
 Hank Linderman – additional engineer
 Erik Lutkins – additional engineer, assistant engineer, Pro Tools engineer
 David Bryant – assistant engineer 
 Matthew Cullen – assistant engineer 
 Brandon Mason – assistant engineer
 Chris Bittner – Pro Tools engineer
 Cory Churko – Pro Tools mixing 
 Mike Shipley – mixing 
 Jeff Burns – mix assistant 
 Robert Hadley – mastering 
 Doug Sax – mastering 
 Harry McCarthy – technical assistant 
 John Prestia – technical assistant 
 Joey Supak – technical assistant 
 Kelly Clauge Wright – creative director, photography
 Glenn Sweitzer – art direction, design 
 John Marcus – illustration
 Scott Siman – illustration
 Dean Brown – photography
 Marina Chavez – photography
 John Ward – photography
 RPM Management – management

Studios
 Tracked at Allaire Studios (Shokan, NY) and Emerald Entertainment (Nashville, TN).
 Engineered at Emerald Entertainment, Sound Stage Studios and Profound Sound Recording Studios (Nashville, TN); Essential Sound (Houston, TX); O'Henry Sound Studios (Burbank, CA); Henson Recording Studios (Hollywood, CA).
 Mixed at Record One (Sherman Oaks, CA).
 Mastered at The Mastering Lab (Hollywood, CA).

Charts and certifications

Weekly charts

Year-end charts

Certifications

References

External links
 

2002 albums
Tim McGraw albums
Curb Records albums
Albums produced by Byron Gallimore
Albums produced by Tim McGraw